Blue Bird High School and College is an educational institute in Sylhet, Bangladesh. It was established on January 6, 1948.

Blue Bird High School and College started as a primary school (up to class 5) and later developed to junior high school and then to college. In 2006 an additional college section was introduced.

Staff 
Principal:  Husne Ara.

Vice principal: Vojendro Nath Das.

References

Educational institutions established in 1961
High schools in Bangladesh
Schools in Sylhet District
1961 establishments in East Pakistan